Flaithnia mac Flainn (died 755) was a king of the Uí Failge, a Laigin people of County Offaly. He was one of the many sons of Fland Dá Chongal, a previous king. He ruled from 741 to 755. 

His predecessor and half-brother Ailill Corrach mac Flainn was killed in 741 but the circumstances are not given. Nothing is recorded of Flaithnia in the annals other than his death obit.

His son Domnall mac Flaíthnia (died 783)  was a king of the Uí Failge.

Notes

See also
 Kings of Ui Failghe

References

 Mac Niocaill, Gearoid (1972), Ireland before the Vikings, Dublin: Gill and Macmillan

External links
CELT: Corpus of Electronic Texts at University College Cork

755 deaths
People from County Offaly
8th-century Irish monarchs
Year of birth unknown